Román Villalobos Solís (born 24 June 1990) is a Costa Rican cyclist, who is provisionally suspended from the sport after taking blood transfusions and a positive anti-doping test for androgen and anabolic steroid metandienone at the 2018 Vuelta Ciclista a Costa Rica.

Major results

2012
 1st  Time trial, National Road Championships
 2nd Overall Vuelta Ciclista a Costa Rica
1st Young rider classification
 3rd Overall Vuelta a Guatemala
1st Young rider classification
2014
 4th Overall Vuelta Ciclista a Costa Rica
1st Stage 5
2015
 1st Overall Vuelta a Guatemala
1st Stage 3
 2nd Overall Vuelta Ciclista a Costa Rica
1st Stage 8
2016
 1st Overall Vuelta a Guatemala
1st Stage 5
 3rd Overall Vuelta Ciclista a Costa Rica
1st Points classification
1st Mountains classification
1st Stages 5 & 6 (ITT)
 3rd Gran Premio de San José
 5th Time trial, Pan American Road Championships
 9th Overall Tour de San Luis
2017
 1st Overall Vuelta Ciclista a Costa Rica
1st Stages 5 (ITT), 7 & 10
 3rd Road race, National Road Championships
2018
 Vuelta Ciclista a Costa Rica
1st Points classification
1st Mountains classification
1st Stages 6 & 7
 1st Stage 2 Tour de San Luis
 2nd Time trial, National Road Championships
 5th Road race, Central American and Caribbean Games

References

External links

1990 births
Living people
Costa Rican male cyclists
People from Heredia Province